Colonial Hall is a historic mansion in Oliver Springs, Tennessee, USA.

History
The two-story house was completed prior to 1799. It is the oldest house in Oliver Springs. It was built for Major Moses C. Winters.

In 1852, the house was purchased by Joseph Estabrook, who served as the fifth president of the University of Tennessee. It was later purchased by Major John Scott, followed by Eliza Gerding Hannah McFerrin, an heiress to coal mines, the widow of Confederate Major John Harvey Hannah and future wife of Dr. R. A. McFerrin, in 1886. The McFerrins lived here with their two sons, General Harvey H. Hannah and Gerald Gerding Hannah, and their daughter, Bernice McFerrin. They added a front porch in 1898. The house was inherited by their daughter, who married Lewis Vaughan Blanton.

Architectural significance
It has been listed on the National Register of Historic Places since September 11, 1975.

References

Houses on the National Register of Historic Places in Tennessee
Houses completed in 1799
Houses in Roane County, Tennessee
National Register of Historic Places in Roane County, Tennessee